Ivo Livi, better known as Yves Montand, ; 13 October 1921 – 9 November 1991) was an Italian-born French actor and singer. He remains one of France's greatest 20th-century artists.

Early life
Montand was born Ivo Livi in Monsummano Terme, Italy, to Giovanni Livi, a broom manufacturer. Ivo held strong Communist beliefs. Montand's mother Giuseppina Simoni was a devout Catholic. The family left Italy for France in 1923 following Benito Mussolini's fascist regime installment. He grew up in Marseille, where, as a young man, he worked in his sister's beauty salon (Salon de Coiffure), as well as later on the docks. He began a career in show business as a music-hall singer. In 1944, he was discovered by Édith Piaf in Paris; she made him part of her act.

Career

Montand achieved international recognition as a singer and actor, starring in many films. His recognizably crooner songs, especially those about Paris, became instant classics. He was one of the best known performers at Bruno Coquatrix's Paris Olympia music hall, and toured with musicians including Didi Duprat. In October 1947, he sang "Mais qu'est-ce que j'ai ?" (music by Henri Betti and lyrics by Édith Piaf) at the Théâtre de l'Étoile. Betti also asked him to sing "C'est si bon" but Montand refused. Following the success of the recording of this song by the Sœurs Étienne in 1948, he decided to record it. Montand was also very popular in the Soviet Union and Eastern Europe, where he did a concert tour in 1956-57.

During his career, Montand acted in American motion pictures as well as on Broadway. He was nominated for a César Award for Best Actor in 1980 for I comme Icare and again in 1984 for Garçon! In 1986, after his international box-office draw power had fallen off considerably, the 65-year-old Montand gave one of his best remembered performances, as the scheming uncle in Jean de Florette, co-starring Gérard Depardieu, and Manon des Sources (both 1986), co-starring Emmanuelle Béart. The film was a worldwide critical hit and revived Montand's profile in the US, where he made an appearance on Late Night with David Letterman.

Personal life

In 1951, he married Simone Signoret, and they co-starred in several films throughout their careers. The marriage was, by all accounts, fairly harmonious, lasting until her death in 1985, although Montand had a number of well-publicized affairs, notably with Marilyn Monroe, with whom he starred in one of her last films, Let's Make Love. He was the stepfather to Signoret's daughter from her prior marriage, Catherine Allégret.

Montand's only child, Valentin, his son by his second wife, Carole Amiel, was born in 1988. In a paternity suit that rocked France, another woman accused Montand of being the father of her daughter and went to court to obtain a DNA sample from him. Montand refused, but the woman persisted even after his death. In a court ruling that made international headlines, the woman won the right to have Montand exhumed and a sample taken. The results indicated that he was probably not the girl's biological father.

He supported left-wing causes during the 1950s and 1960s, and attended Communist festivals and meetings. In later life he supported right-wing causes.

Signoret and Montand had a home in Autheuil-Authouillet, Normandy, where the main village street is named after him.

In his later years he maintained a home in Saint-Paul-de-Vence, Provence, until his death from a heart attack in November 1991. In an interview, Jean-Jacques Beineix said, "[H]e died on the set [of IP5: The Island of Pachyderms]... On the very last day, after his very last shot. It was the very last night and we were doing retakes. He finished what he was doing and then he just died. And the film tells the story of an old man who dies from a heart attack, which is the same thing that happened!" Montand is interred next to his first wife, Simone Signoret, in Père Lachaise Cemetery in Paris.

In 2004, Catherine Allégret, Signoret's daughter from her first marriage to director Yves Allégret, alleged in her autobiography Un monde a l'envers (A World Upside Down) that she had been sexually abused by her stepfather from the age of five; his behaviour apparently continuing for many years. and that he had a "more than equivocal attitude to her" as she got older. However she also claimed to have been reconciled to him in the latter years of his life.

Filmography

Discography

1952: Chante (Odéon)
1953: Chante ses dernières créations (Odéon)
1953: Chante Paris (Odéon)
1953: Récital au Théâtre de l'Étoile 1953 (Odéon, live)
1954: Chante ses derniers succès (Odéon)
1954: # 54 (Odéon)
1955: Chansons populaires de France (Odéon)
1957: 13 ans déjà ! (Odéon)
1958: Dix chansons pour l'été (Odéon)
1958: Succès du Récital 1958 au Théâtre de L'Étoile (Odéon)
1958: Récital 1 + Récital 2 (Philips)
1958: Étoile 58 (Philips)
1960: Dansez avec Yves Montand (Philips)
1961: Rengaine ta rengaine (Philips)
1962: Chante Prévert (Philips)
1962: Récital 63 – Intégral du Théâtre de l'Étoile (Philips, live)
1967: 7 (Philips)
1968: La Bicyclette (Philips)
1968: Le Paris de... (Philips)
1968: À l'Olympia (Philips, live)
1970: On a Clear Day You Can See Forever (Columbia, soundtrack with Barbra Streisand)
1972: Dans son dernier "One man show" intégral (CBS, live)
1974: Montand de mon temps (CBS or TriStar Music)
1981: D'hier et d'aujourd'hui (Philips)
1981: Le disque de la paix (Philips)
1982: Olympia 81 (Philips)
1983: In English (Philips)
1984: Chante David Mc Neil (Philips)
1988: Trois places pour le 26 (Philips, w/ Mathilda May, soundtrack)
1993: Les années Odéon – 1945–1958 (Columbia, 9-CD boxset)
1997: Plaisirs inédits (Universal)
2000: Et la fête continue – Intégrale 1945–1949 – Vol. 1 (Frémeaux)
2001: Inédits, rares & indispensables (Mercury, 4-CD boxset)
2004: Sensationnel – Intégrale 1949–1953 – Vol. 2 (Frémeaux)
2007: Une étoile à l'Étoile – Intégrale 1953–1954 – Vol. 3 (Frémeaux, live)

References

External links

 International Jose Guillermo Carrillo Foundation
 
 
 
 

1921 births
1991 deaths
Burials at Père Lachaise Cemetery
French male film actors
Italian male film actors
Italian emigrants to France
Male actors from Marseille
People from the Province of Pistoia
David di Donatello winners
Musicians from Marseille
20th-century French male actors
20th-century French male singers